Tyler Cecil Hornby-Forbes (born 8 March 1996) is an English professional footballer who last played for Colne, as a right-back and right winger.

Career

Fleetwood Town

Hornby-Forbes was a youth player at Preston North End and progressed through the academy. However, at the end of the season, Hornby-Forbes was released by the club following his end of his scholarships and moved to Fleetwood Town in the summer of 2014.

He made his professional debut for them on 15 November 2014, having lost his mother only a few days beforehand. Usually a winger, Hornby-Forbes played as a right-back in that match due to the absence of usual starter Conor McLaughlin, who was absent on international duty with Northern Ireland. On 20 March 2015, Hornby-Forbes provided an assist for Jamie Proctor to score the club's first goal of the game and the club went on to score a late equaliser to draw 2–2 against Bradford City. Hornby-Forbes went on to be a first team regular in the 2014–15 season, playing in the right-back position and made seventeen appearances. At the end of the 2014–15 season, Hornby-Forbes was offered a new contract by Fleetwood Town.

In the 2015–16 season, Hornby-Forbes scored on his first appearance of the season, in a 4–3 win over Bury on 18 August 2015 and then scored his second goal for the club on 19 September 2015, in a 2–1 loss against Wigan Athletic. However, Hornby-Forbes spent most of the season on the substitute bench, due to Conor McLaughlin's form and his own injury concern. At the end of the season, Hornby-Forbes made sixteen appearances and scoring two times and was offered a new contract by the club. However, Hornby-Forbes' future at the club was in doubt after yet signed a contract and attracted interests from Brighton & Hove Albion when they had a bid from Fleetwood Town accepted.

Brighton & Hove Albion
On 12 July 2016, Hornby-Forbes transferred to Football League Championship side Brighton & Hove Albion for an undisclosed fee, signing a two-year contract and initially linking up with the club's development squad. He moved on loan to Accrington Stanley in August 2017, in January 2018 he returned to the club. He was released by Brighton at the end of the 2017–18 season.

Newport County
On 28 June 2018, Hornby-Forbes signed for Newport County on a one-year deal. He made his debut for the club on the opening day of the 2018–19 season, starting in a 3–0 defeat to Mansfield Town. On 27 March 2019 he joined Salford City on loan until the end of the 2018–19 season but did not play a match for them whilst at the club. He was released by Newport at the end of the 2018–19 season.

Non-league career
In September 2019 he signed for AFC Fylde on non-contract terms. In January 2020, he was loaned out to Spennymoor Town for the rest of the season, before the deal was made permanent in June 2020. In August 2021, he signed for Northern Premier League Division One West side Colne.

Career statistics

References

External links

1996 births
Living people
English footballers
Preston North End F.C. players
Fleetwood Town F.C. players
Brighton & Hove Albion F.C. players
Accrington Stanley F.C. players
Newport County A.F.C. players
Salford City F.C. players
AFC Fylde players
Spennymoor Town F.C. players
Colne F.C. players
English Football League players
National League (English football) players
Northern Premier League players
Association football wingers
Association football fullbacks